Eva Wilhelmina Julia von Bahr-Bergius, (16 September 1874 – 28 February 1962) was a Swedish physicist and teacher at a folk high school. She was the first woman in Sweden to become a docent in physics. She is known for her contact with and support of the poet Dan Andersson, for her friendship and support of the physicist Lise Meitner, and as a Catholic writer.

Biography

Background 
Eva von Bahr's parents were häradshövding (district judge) Carl von Bahr (1830–1900) and his wife Elisabeth Boström (1838–1914). She was the sister of Johan von Bahr, mayor of Uppsala, and niece of prime minister Erik Gustaf Boström (1842–1907) and philanthropist Ebba Boström (1844–1902), founder of the charitable institution Samariterhemmet in Uppsala. Eva von Bahr was born at Mälby farm in Roslags-Kulla (now in Österåker Municipality).

Academic career 
Despite her family's wishes she wanted an education and studied for a year at the Askov folk high school in Denmark, where Poul la Cour encouraged her interest in physics and mathematics. In 1901, von Bahr matriculated at Uppsala University, in 1907 she passed her licentiate exam and in 1908 she defended her doctoral thesis about infrared radiation absorption in gases. Her thesis was praised and she was given a docent stipend, becoming the first woman physics docent in Sweden.

Starting in 1909 she worked as a docent at the Physics department in Uppsala with the support of professor Knut Ångström. But following Ångström's sudden death in 1910, von Bahr was not allowed to teach, except as a temp. Only after 1925 were women allowed to work at universities in Sweden. In 1912, after being stopped from being a professor in Uppsala and at Chalmers tekniska läroanstalt because she was a woman, von Bahr applied for a position at University of Berlin. The institution had number of outstanding physicists, among them Albert Einstein, Max Planck, Max von Laue, Walther Nernst, Fritz Haber, Lise Meitner, James Franck and Gustav Hertz. Von Bahr developed a close friendship with Lise Meitner.

After her visit to Berlin, von Bahr exchanged letters with Meitner; she also had close contact with the mathematician and theoretical physicist Carl Wilhelm Oseen in Uppsala. In January 1913, von Bahr again travelled to Berlin, where she worked under professor Heinrich Rubens. During her time there, von Bahr conducted experiments that supported Max Planck's theories, which made her the only Swedish physicist to be mentioned by Niels Bohr during his Nobel lecture in 1922. During that spring, von Bahr was invited to work with James Franck and Gustav Hertz, and joined their group that autumn.

Return to Sweden 

At the beginning of January 1914, von Bahr had to cut short her time in Berlin to care for her ill mother. The year after she planned to return to Berlin, but due to the outbreak of World War I that was not possible, so  she took a position as teacher at Brunnsvik folk high school in Dalarna. At Brunnsvik, she met Niklas Bergius (1871-1947), a fellow teacher, whom she married on 19 June 1917. In the autumn of 1918, food was scarce in Sweden due to the war and the school was closed, so the couple travelled to Charlottenlund in Denmark where they met with Jesuits. This period in Denmark awakened von Bahr's interest in Catholicism, before that she had been an atheist.

After the end of World War I, Lise Meitner visited von Bahr in Sweden and  stayed in her home for four weeks. In the winter of 1919-1920, von Bahr traveled to London, Pau, Algiers, Tunis, and Italy.

After some years, she moved to Kungälv in order to be closer to the Catholic congregation in Gothenburg. When Lise Meitner's situation in Germany became dangerous during the summer of 1938 von Bahr, together with Wilhelm Oseen and Niels Bohr, was very active in helping her to escape and to arrange for her stay in Sweden and a research position.

While in Sweden in December 1938, Lise Meitner and Otto Robert Frisch managed to theorize nuclear fission.

After the outbreak of World War II and the German occupation of Norway, von Bahr was active in the Swedish humanitarian organization Svenska Norgehjälpen (Swedish Support of Norway).

Eva von Bahr was also a philanthropist, and for some time she supported among others Lise Meitner and the poet Dan Andersson. She also contributed funds to Brunnsviks Folkhögskola and donated the house in Kungälv that she had built. After her husband's death in 1947 von Bahr moved to Uppsala. During her time in Uppsala she was interested in the Jesuit priest and writer Pierre Teilhard de Chardin and she kept contact and mail exchange with Lise Meitner. Eva von Bahr died on 28 February 1962 and was buried at the Catholic cemetery in Stockholm.

Works
 Ueber die Einwirkung des Druckes auf die Absorption ultraroter Strahlung durch Gase. Akademisk avhandling, Uppsala, 2008.
 Om katolicismen : några ord till protestanter. Almqvist & wiksell,distr. 1929.
 Min väg tillbaka till kristendomen. Almqvist & wiksell, 1933.
 Efterskrift till Min väg tillbaka till kristendomen. Almqvist & Wiksell, 1934.
 Ur "spridda minnen från ett långt liv". (Acta Universitatis Upsaliensis, Skrifter rörande Uppsala universitet. B. Inbjudningar, 177), 2015, sida 7-73

Footnotes

References

 Eva V J Bergius i Svenskt biografiskt lexikon, Volume 3 (1922), p. 575
 Eva von Bahr-Bergius in Vem är vem, Götalandsdelen utom Skåne, 1948
 Dan Andersson: Hjärtats oro : Dan Anderssonss brev til Elsa Ouchterlony, Eva von Bahr og søsteren Anna Andersson, samlet og med kommentar av Gunde Johansson. Dan Andersson-sällskapets skrifter, Zindermans 1993.
 Maria Ekelund: Konsten att komma ut som katolik: En studie i rationaliseringen av den icke-rationella längtan efter Gud i Eva von Bahr-Bergius konversionsberättelse. Institutionen för idé- och lärdomshistoria, Uppsala universitet. C-uppsats, 2007.
 Hedvig Hedqvist, Kärlek och Kärnfysik,  Albert Bonniers Forlag, Stockholm  (2012). 
 Gösta Larsson: Niklas Bergius, Eva von Bahr och Dan Andersson. Stockholm: vulkan, 2011.
 Birgitta Meurling: "En utdragen balansakt : kvinnliga forskares strategier inom akademin". Part of: Att se det osedda : vänbok till Ann-Sofie Ohlander.  2006, p. 159-180.
 Staffan Wennerholm: "I fysikforskningens utkant. Eva von Bahrs vetenskapliga gemenskaper 1909–1914", Lychnos, 2007, p. 7–41.

Further reading

External links 

 Eva von Bahr, from Svensk biografisk handbok (Swedish)

1874 births
1962 deaths
Swedish women physicists